Grizzly web server framework has been designed to help developers to take advantage of the Java non-blocking I/O (NIO) API. Grizzly's goal is to help developers to build scalable and robust servers using NIO as well as offering extended framework components: web framework (HTTP/S), WebSocket, Comet.

Overview
The Core Framework of Grizzly includes
 Memory Management
 I/O Strategies
 Transports and Connections
 FilterChain and Filters
 Core Configuration
 Port Unification
 JMX Monitoring

HTTP components include
 Core HTTP Framework
 HTTP Server Framework
 HTTP Server Framework Extras
 Comet
 JAXWS
 WebSockets
 AJP
 SPDY

References

External links

 
 Eclipse Grizzly project as a part of Eclipse Enterprise for Java (EE4J)

Java enterprise platform